Mulligan's Stew is an American comedy-drama television series, that originally aired as a 90-minute NBC television film on June 20, 1977, and later, as a 60-minute series from October 25 to December 13, 1977. The series focused on the lives of the Mulligan family, who live in the fictitious Southern California community of Birchfield; high school teacher and football coach, Michael (Lawrence Pressman), his wife, Jane (Elinor Donahue), who is a school nurse.

Synopsis
Michael and Jane Mulligan have three children: Mark, Melinda and Jimmy. They find making ends meet difficult, but manageable. Things get tighter moneywise and spacewise when the Mulligans take in their nephew Adam (Moose) and nieces Polaris (Polly) and Starshine (Stevie) Freedman, after their parents (Michael's sister and brother-in-law) are killed in a plane crash in Hawaii while in the process of adopting the Vietnamese-born Kimmy, leaving the Mulligans to finalize the adoption. They deal with the changes and bond as a family.

Cast
Lawrence Pressman	... 	Michael Mulligan
Elinor Donahue	... 	Jane Mulligan
Johnny Whitaker    ...     Mark Mulligan (movie)
Johnny Doran ... Mark Mulligan (series)
Julie Anne Haddock	... 	Melinda Mulligan
K.C. Martel	... 	Jimmy Mulligan
Lory Koccheim as Polaris "Polly" Freedman
Suzanne Crough as Stevie Freedman
Chris Ciampa as Adam "Moose" Freedman
Sunshine Lee as Kimmy Nguyen Freedman

Episodes

Reception
Mulligan's Stew was scheduled opposite four Top 20 hits: Three's Company and Soap on ABC, and M*A*S*H and One Day at a Time on CBS. As a result, it suffered from dismal ratings, and was cancelled at the end of 1977. It ranked dead last out of 104 shows airing that season with an average 10.5 rating.

References

External links

 

1977 American television series debuts
1977 American television series endings
1970s American comedy-drama television series
NBC original programming
English-language television shows
Television series about families
Television series by CBS Studios
Television shows set in California